Arne Aasheim (born 25 October 1945) is a Norwegian civil servant and diplomat.

He holds the cand.mag. degree and was hired in the Ministry of Foreign Affairs in 1976. He served as Norway's ambassador to Guatemala from 1997 to 2000, to Morocco from 2003 to 2008 and to Mexico from 2009 to 2013. In between his three stints as an ambassador, he served as a special adviser in the Ministry of Foreign Affairs.

References

1945 births
Living people
Norwegian civil servants
Ambassadors of Norway to Guatemala
Ambassadors of Norway to Morocco
Ambassadors of Norway to Mexico